George Francis Power (16 March 1910 – 1977) was an English footballer who played as a goalkeeper for Rochdale. He was also on the reserve team of Manchester City and played non-league football for various other clubs.

References

Rochdale A.F.C. players
Manchester City F.C. players
Darwen F.C. players
Altrincham F.C. players
Macclesfield Town F.C. players
Bangor City F.C. players
English footballers
Footballers from Bolton
1910 births
1977 deaths
Association footballers not categorized by position